Zygmunt Kukla may refer to:

 Zygmunt Kukla (conductor) (born 1969), Polish conductor, arranger, and composer
 Zygmunt Kukla (footballer) (1948-2016), Polish footballer